Elizabeth le Despenser (c. 1327 – 13 July 1389) was an English noblewoman. She was the youngest daughter of Hugh le Despenser the younger and his wife Eleanor de Clare. Her father is famous for being the favourite of Edward II of England; he was executed as a result of his position and actions. Through her mother, Elizabeth was a great granddaughter of King Edward I of England.

Early life
The exact date of her birth is disputed; it is possible that she (or her brother John) was born in December 1325. She may have been born to her mother sometime after her father's death, as she was not forced to take the veil like three of her older sisters. Not much else is known about her youth until August 1338, when she was sent to the care of her maternal aunt Elizabeth de Clare after her mother Eleanor's death the previous year.

Marriage and later life
In August 1338, she married Maurice de Berkeley, 4th Baron Berkeley, who was ironically a grandson of Roger Mortimer, 1st Earl of March, the man largely responsible for the execution of Elizabeth's father Hugh. She and her husband had seven children:

 Thomas de Berkeley, 5th Lord Berkeley (born 5 January 1352/53 – 13 July 1417); married Margaret de Lisle, Baroness Lisle
 Sir James de Berkeley (born c. 1355 – 13 June 1405), married Elizabeth Bluet; sired James Berkeley, 1st Baron Berkeley
 John de Berkeley (born c. 1357–1381)
 Maurice de Berkeley (born c. 1358; death date unknown), married Jane Hereford
 Catherine de Berkeley (born c. 1360; death date unknown)
 Agnes de Berkeley (born c. 1363; death date unknown)
 Elizabeth de Berkeley (born c. 1365; death date unknown)

Death
Elizabeth le Despenser, Baroness Berkeley died on 13 July 1389. She was buried at St Botolph's Aldgate, London, England.

Ancestry

References

1327 births
1389 deaths
Date of birth unknown
English baronesses
Elizabeth
People from Aldgate
Elizabeth